Academy Fantasia, Season 7 is the seventh season of Academy Fantasia which premiered on True Visions on June 27, 2010.

Por (V12), Annop Thongborisut won in the competition.

Changes from Season 6
This is the first season to lower the age of contestant limit down to only 15 years old, though the upper age limit is not scheduled to change, which still remains at 25 years old. It is surprised that all of Top 100 finalists from first audition round, both regional & online auditions, will go into the AF house. The judges will eliminate 88 of them in the first week concert, to only Top 12 for the eleven weeks competition.

Like the Season 6 the immunity idol still could help the contestants being safe from the elimination in the event of, if they received the least popular vote of the week. However, in the beginning of the concert week 7, it was announced that this immune rule would be stopped, which would be effective since week 7.

Auditions
There were two channel for auditions, Live and Online. The contestants were required to between the ages of 15 to 25 years old who are not embedded with music recording contracts.

The Live Auditions were held in the following cities:
 The South district, Surat Thani
 The North district, Chiangmai
 The Northeast district, Nakhon Ratchasima
 The Center district, Bangkok

Semi-finalists
The Top 100 finalists (50 from live audition and 50 from online audition) were announced and got a chance to practice themselves for a show in the AF house for a week. The final audition was also the first week concert of this season, which was held at Thunder Dome, Muang Thong Thani.

After their show, the Top 100 finalists were cut off to Top 50, and Top 25, which mixed of 12 boys and 13 girls. At the end of the concert, the winners of AF in season 1-6 came to announce the list of Top 12 contestants of this season. And lastly the result was shown with 6 boys and 6 girls would still in the running for this eleven weeks.

In this season, there was no any contestant from the online audition could get through Top 12. This is the first time since Academy Fantasia started to extend a channel of audition to an online registration (since season 4).

It was noticed there were many 18-year-old contestants get through this Top 12, Grape (V2), New (V4), Natty (V5), & Pum (V7) all are 15-year-old girls, while Boss (V10) & Por (V12) are 16-year-old boys, Paprae (V9) & Mark (V11) are both 17.

Concert summaries

Week 1 - Top 100 Semi Final Audition
Original Airdate: July 3, 2010

1Mark (V11) retired from the competition at the end of the concert week 3.

2Ton (V13) replaced Mark (V11) and showed his first performance on the concert week 4.

Week 2 - Rock
Original Airdate: July 10, 2010

 Did not perform: Mark (V11)

At the beginning of the concert week 2, they announced that there was no any elimination for the night. All of Top 12 contestants would be safe, even Mark (V11) who did not make a performance but still on the running onward. However, the votes for week 2 would be kept for the upcoming week, and they didn't declare bottom three results for the week.

Week 3 - Hot Debut (During years contestants were born, 1988-1995)
Original Airdate: July 17, 2010

 Withdrew: Mark (V11)
 Bottom three: New (V4), Green (V8), & Paprae (V9)
 Immuned & Safe from elimination: Green (V8)

After Top 12 finalists had performed in a theme of Hot Debut (Songs during years they were born), the audiences were shocked due to the withdrawal of Mark (V11) at the end of his show. Then, they declared bottom three of the week, and the judges decided to provide the immunity idol to Green (V8). Finally, the popular votes result was announced and the least vote contestant was also Green (V8), so he was safe from this first elimination.

However, it was announced later that the day after the concert week 3, the substitution contestant (probably be one of Top 25 finalists) would be sent into the AF house, replaced Mark (V11) who withdrew from the competition.

Week 4 - Korean Songs
Original Airdate: July 24, 2010

 Bottom three: Grape (V2), Natty (V5), & Boss (V10)
 Immuned & Safe from elimination: Natty (V5)

It was the second time for this season that the judges could make a right decision on giving the immunity idol to the least vote contestant of the week, Natty (V5) by accidentally. As a result, Top 12 (included Ton (V13) who was a new joiner in the AF house as Top 12) still remain in the competition.

Week 5 - Single Show (Contestant's Choice)
Original Airdate: July 31, 2010

 Bottom three: Meen (V1), Grape (V2), & Namkhang (V6)
 Immuned & Safe from elimination: Meen (V1)

It was another week that the immunity idol could save the least voted contestant by chance, once again, after last two consecutive weeks in the concert week 3 & 4. Meen (V1), who was immuned from the judges also was declared as the least voted contestant of the week. From this, she was still running on the competition, and all of the rest still remain in the AF house once again.

Week 6 - Songs for Mother
Original Airdate: August 7, 2010

 Bottom three: Meen (V1), Green (V8), & Paprae (V9)
 Immuned: Green (V8)
 Eliminated: Meen (V1)

The concert week 6 was in a theme of songs for mother, which is performed during the upcoming mother's day on August 12. The contestants were surprised from the attending in a show of their mothers for this concert. Finally, the result was shown that one who received the least vote of the week was not the same person who was immuned by judges, so there would definitely be the first elimination of this season. At the end of a concert, Meen (V1) was announced as the first contestant who would leave the competition, and there were only 11 still in the running.

Week 7 - Music Festival (International Hits)
Original Airdate: August 14, 2010

 Top five: Grape (V2), New (V4), Paprae (V9), Por (V12), & Ton (V13)
 Bottom three: Natty (V5), Pum (V7), & Green (V8)
 Eliminated: Green (V8)

At the beginning of the concert week 7, it was declared that there would be no the immunity idol during the last half of this season (Week 7 - 12). The concert was in Music Festival theme, which consisted of three different music categories; R&B, Rock, & Techno-Hiphop. At the end of the show, they announced a list of five contestants, instead of bottom three as usual, and then it was declared that five of them were all the Top 5 popular votes of the week. It was noticed that it was the first time of Pum (V7), who always receive good feedback and comments from judges, of being in the bottom three. However, the final result was shown that Green (V8), who was not eliminated on week 3, received the fewest votes of the night. From this new rule of no the immunity idol, effective in this week, made him get eliminated.

Week 8 - Tag Teams (Duet & Battle Songs)
Original Airdate: August 21, 2010

 Bottom three: Grape (V2), Natty (V5), & Paprae (V9)
 Eliminated: Paprae (V9)

Week 9 - Songs of Thongchai McIntyre (Musical Part I)
Original Airdate: August 28, 2010

 Bottom three: Natty (V5), Namkhang (V6), & Boss (V10)
 Eliminated: Natty (V5)

Week 10 - Thai Contemporary & Country (Musical Part II)
Original Airdate: September 4, 2010

 Bottom three: Ben (V3), Namkhang (V6), & Pum (V7)
 Eliminated: Ben (V3)

Week 11 - Variety Dance
Original Airdate: September 11, 2010

 Bottom three: Grape (V2), Pum (V7), & Por (V12)
 Eliminated: Pum (V7)

Week 12 - Grand Finale
Original Airdate: September 18, 2010

Special Show

(In order of performance)

 Fifth Runner-Up: Grape (V2)
 Fourth Runner-Up: Namkhang (V6)
 Third Runner-Up: New (V4)
 Second Runner-Up: Boss (V10)
 First Runner-Up: Ton (V13)
 The Winner: Por (V12)

Contestants

In order of elimination
(ages stated are at time of competition)

Summaries

Elimination chart

Professional trainers
Principal
 Sattha Satthathip
 Orawan Yenpoonsook

Voice Trainers
 Saovanit Nawapan (Head)
 Attapol Muncharoen
 Viriyapa Chansuwong

Dance Trainers
 Pattarawarin Timkul (Head)

Acting Trainers
 Songyos Sukmakanan (Head)
 Rossukon Kongket

Judges
 Suthee Sangserichon (Main)
 Prakasit Bosuwan
 Vanessa Guntsopon
 Thana Laowasut
 Jeerasak Panpoom
 Dares Raksarak
 Manrat Tumkanont
 Sumet Ong-arj
 Marut Sarowart

References

2010 Thai television seasons

th:ทรู อะคาเดมี่ แฟนเทเชีย
wuu:泰国学园唱歌比赛